Captain James Madison Cutts Jr. (October 20, 1837 - February 24, 1903) was an American soldier who fought in the American Civil War. Cutts received the country's highest award for bravery during combat, the Medal of Honor, for his actions during the Battles of the Wilderness, Spotsylvania and Petersburg in Virginia in May and June 1864. He was honored with the award on 2 May 1891.

Early life
Cutts was born in Washington D.C. on October 20, 1837, the son of James Madison Cutts, an official of the U.S. Treasury Department, and Ellen Elisabeth O'Neal, the sister of Rose O'Neal Greenhow.  Cutts' sister Adele was the second wife of US Senator Stephen A. Douglas.  Cutts was the grandson of congressman Richard Cutts, whose wife Anna was the sister of First Lady Dolley Madison.  He attended Georgetown Preparatory School, graduated from Brown University in 1856, and received his LL.B. from Harvard Law School in 1861.

Civil War service
At the start of the American Civil War, Cutts enlisted with the 1st Rhode Island Infantry.  Six weeks later, in May 1861, he was appointed as a Captain in the newly created 11th Infantry Regiment.  Burnside appointed Cutts as a judge advocate where he served as the prosecutor of Clement Vallandigham.  While serving on the staff of Ambrose Burnside in 1863, Cutts was charged with conduct unbecoming an officer and a gentleman after he allegedly committed several offenses, including criticizing Burnside in letters to the president, constantly arguing with his fellow officers, and attempting to view a married woman dressing in the hotel room next to his by peering over the transom.  His appeal reached President Lincoln, who approved the convictions, but reduced the punishment to a written reprimand.  Lincoln then wrote Cutts a letter, likely presented in person, indicating that he was sure the "peeping" offense would not be repeated, and urging Cutts to attain his full potential by demonstrating the self-control necessary to avoid pointless quarrels with his peers and superiors.  Cutts is reported to have been so chastened that he resolved to reclaim his reputation through battlefield heroism.

Cutts displayed gallantry at the Battle of the Wilderness, the Battle of Spotsylvania and the Battle of Petersburg between May 5 and June 18, 1864.  He received the Medal of Honor for these actions on May 2, 1891.  Claims that Cutts received a "triple" Medal of Honor are not accurate; he received a single award that cited his combined heroism in three separate battles.

Medal of Honor citation
"For gallantry at Wilderness, Spotsylvania and Petersburg, 1864."

Continued Army career
After the war, Cutts was transferred to the 20th Infantry Regiment.  While serving in Louisiana in 1868, Cutts was accused of being intoxicated while on duty, being indecently dressed, and being abusive to the soldiers under his command.  Informed that the convening authority for his subsequent court-martial intended to recommend his dismissal from the service, Cutts resigned his commission on June 19, 1868.

Later life
After leaving the Army, Cutts taught rhetoric and oratory at Seton Hall University.  In 1882, he moved to Washington to take a position in the War Department, first serving in the surgeon general's office, and later in the office of the Army's adjutant general.

Death and burial
On February 19, 1903, Cutts became ill from uremia on a Washington, D.C.  street car while returning to work after his lunch break.  He remained at Emergency Hospital until he died in Washington on February 24, 1903.  Cutts was buried at Arlington National Cemetery, Section 3, Site 1371-SS.

Family
In 1871, Cutts married Mary E. Wheeler of Baltimore.  They were the parents of six children, including Leo, Mary, Arthur, Horace, James and Harold.

See also

List of American Civil War Medal of Honor recipients: A–F

References

Sources

Newspapers

Internet

External links
Arlington National Cemetery

1837 births
1903 deaths
People of Rhode Island in the American Civil War
Union Army officers
United States Army Medal of Honor recipients
American Civil War recipients of the Medal of Honor
Brown University alumni
Harvard Law School alumni
Seton Hall University faculty